We Love Disney is a 2015 compilation album and third entry in the eponymous series, featuring cover versions of Disney songs by English-speaking musicians from various genres. It was released by Verve Records and Walt Disney Records in the United States on October 30, 2015. Two editions of the album were released: a single-disc standard edition, and a digipak deluxe edition, containing two bonus tracks.

Track listing

Production
After a successful run with localized versions in France, Australia and Germany (titled "I Love Disney" for the latter), David Foster decided to produce a new compilation album for the United States market. During development, Foster created a wish list of American music artists for the album. Foster often choose the song he felt fit the artist's style and vocal abilities, although several artists, such as Ariana Grande, Jason Derulo, and Kacey Musgraves began with different songs before ultimately settling on their eventual selections. Lucy Hale was suggested at Disney's behest, as Hale also appears on the company's Hollywood Records roster.

We Love Disney is a co-production between Verve Records and Walt Disney Records, with Universal Music Group providing worldwide distribution and marketing from Disney Music Group, alongside Universal.

Release
The album's release date was announced on August 14, 2015 at Disney's D23 Expo, where Ne-Yo performed "Friend Like Me" as part of the company's tribute to Robin Williams, who performed the original song in the film. A music video for Ne-Yo's cover was released on October 1, 2015. Later that year, Derulo, Grande, Kelly, Perry, and Aiko performed their selections from their album at the 2015 Disney Parks Christmas Day Parade.

Release history

Commercial performance
We Love Disney debuted at No. 8 on the US Billboard 200 chart with 31,000 album-equivalent units; it sold 26,000 copies in its first week, with the remainder of its unit total reflecting the album's streaming activity and track sales.

Charts

References

External links
 

2015 compilation albums
Verve Records compilation albums
Walt Disney Records compilation albums
Albums produced by David Foster
Covers albums